The 2020 season was the Buffalo Bills' 61st as a franchise, 51st in the National Football League, the sixth full season under the ownership of Terry and Kim Pegula and fourth under the head coach/general manager tandem of Sean McDermott and Brandon Beane. After acquiring players such as Stefon Diggs, Mario Addison, and A. J. Klein during the offseason, the Bills offense, led by quarterback Josh Allen, took another step forward, scoring a franchise-record 501 points and leading the Bills to 13 wins in the regular season, and their first playoff wins and first AFC Championship appearance of the 21st century.

The Bills began the season strong with a 4–0 start, their first since 2008. Despite two straight losses afterwards, with both of their games during their losing streak postponed due to a COVID-19 outbreak within the Tennessee Titans' organization, the Bills won 9 of their final 10 games, with their only loss during that span being the "Hail Murray" game against the Arizona Cardinals, to finish on a six-game winning streak with a 13–3 record, improving on their 10–6 record from 2019 and tying the franchise record set in the Super Bowl seasons of 1990 and 1991.

In addition to returning to the playoffs for the third time in four years after previously going 17 consecutive seasons without a playoff appearance, the team won the AFC East division title for the first time since 1995 (during the Marv Levy/Jim Kelly era) after a 48–19 win over the Denver Broncos in Week 15, becoming only the second team other than the 2008 Miami Dolphins to win the division over the New England Patriots since . Not only did they sweep the Patriots for the first time since , but the Bills swept their entire division for the first time in franchise history. They also qualified for the playoffs in consecutive years for the first time since 1998 and 1999 (during the Wade Phillips/Doug Flutie era), which was also the last time the Bills had back-to-back double-digit-win seasons.

The #2 seed Bills began their playoff run in the Wild Card Round against the #7 seed Indianapolis Colts, winning 27–24 for their first playoff victory since 1995. After this, they defeated the #5 seed Baltimore Ravens 17–3 in the Divisional Round, advancing to their first AFC Championship Game since 1993, where they faced the #1 seed and defending Super Bowl champion Kansas City Chiefs, who they coincidentally faced in their last AFC Championship Game appearance. The Bills would lose 38–24.

Draft

Draft trades

Staff

Final roster

Preseason
The Bills' preseason schedule was announced on May 7, 2020, but was later cancelled due to the COVID-19 pandemic.

Regular season

Schedule
The Bills' 2020 schedule was announced on May 7.

Note: Intra-division opponents are in bold text.

Game summaries

Week 1: vs. New York Jets

Buffalo handily won after racing to a 21–0 second quarter lead. Quarterback Josh Allen surpassed 300 passing yards for the first time in his career—throwing for 312, to be exact—and rushed 14 times for 57 yards as newly acquired receiver Stefon Diggs made his debut with the team. The defense largely shut down the Jets' offense aside from a field goal, a 69-yard touchdown pass from Sam Darnold to Jamison Crowder and a garbage-time touchdown in the fourth quarter, though rookie kicker Tyler Bass struggled in his debut, missing two of his four field goal attempts.

Week 2: at Miami Dolphins

In a back-and-forth affair against the rival Dolphins and former Bills quarterback Ryan Fitzpatrick, Josh Allen sealed the game for the Bills with two fourth-quarter touchdown passes to rookie Gabe Davis and John Brown, respectively, as the defense was playing without starting linebackers Tremaine Edmunds and Matt Milano. Stefon Diggs also caught his first touchdown as a Buffalo Bill, which occurred during a power outage at Hard Rock Stadium in the second quarter that temporarily prevented CBS from airing the game. With the win, Buffalo improved to 2–0, as Allen threw for a career-high in passing yards with 415.

Week 3: vs. Los Angeles Rams

Buffalo raced to a 28–3 lead in the middle of the third quarter, but after a pass from Josh Allen to TE Tyler Kroft was controversially ruled an interception for Los Angeles as Rams DB John Johnson III grabbed the ball moments after Kroft caught it, the Rams stormed back with five scoring drives to erase the deficit and take the lead in the fourth quarter. Allen would nonetheless lead a game-winning drive in the final four minutes of the game, including three crucial passes to WR Cole Beasley, capping it off with a touchdown pass to Kroft following a defensive pass interference call on Darious Williams on 4th and 9. With the win, not only did Buffalo start 3–0 for the second year in a row, but for the third week in a row, Allen threw for over 300 yards.

Week 4: at Las Vegas Raiders

Buffalo scored on the opening drive of the game when Josh Allen found a wide open Gabe Davis for a 26-yard touchdown. The Bills would not lose the lead for the remainder of the game, with Allen continuing his hot start to the season. Late in the second quarter, Allen scrambled and found Stefon Diggs for a 9-yard gain, but took a big hit from Raiders DE Arden Key, resulting in an injury to his left shoulder. He would return, however, and score on a 1-yard quarterback sneak, along with 136 yards passing in the second half, with his longest being a 49-yard throw to Diggs. Buffalo would win and go to 4–0 for the first time since 2008 (the team started 4–0 that season before losing nine of their final 12 games).

Week 5: at Tennessee Titans

Due to a COVID-19 outbreak within the Titans organization, the game was at first postponed from Sunday to the following Tuesday, marking the first time since 2010 that an NFL regular-season game was played on a Tuesday. In a battle of unbeaten teams, the Bills, missing starters such as Matt Milano, John Brown, Quinton Spain and Tre'Davious White, were unable to contain Titans quarterback Ryan Tannehill, who scored four overall touchdowns on the Bills defense. To make matters worse, three turnovers by Buffalo allowed for short fields and quick touchdowns for the Titans. With their first loss of the season and first loss to Tennessee since 2012, the Bills fell to 4–1.

Week 6: vs. Kansas City Chiefs

Despite holding the high-powered Kansas City offense to 13 points in the first half of a rain-soaked game postponed from the previous Thursday (due to the Titans game being pushed back to the previous Tuesday), the Bills defense was not able to contain Chiefs rookie RB Clyde Edwards-Helaire, who led Kansas City to 245 rushing yards, while the Bills offense was bottled up for the most part, despite numerous pass-interference penalties called on the Chiefs secondary and two Josh Allen TD passes to Diggs and Beasley. A missed field goal by the Bills at the end of the first half proved costly, as the Chiefs were able to go up by two scores with a late field goal, preventing a potential game-winning drive by the Bills. Instead, Allen was intercepted on the final drive with 1:20 remaining, sealing the win for the Chiefs. With the loss, Buffalo fell to 4–2.

Week 7: at New York Jets

In a rematch from Week 1, New York jumped to an early 10–0 lead following a strip-sack of Allen by Jets linebacker Tarell Basham, but the Bills would score 18 unanswered points, all field goals by Tyler Bass, who went 6-of-8 with his field goals on the day, to win an ugly game. The Bills moved the ball well outside the red zone and were never forced to punt. Despite early struggles, Buffalo's defense was outstanding after halftime, allowing just 4 total yards to the Jets offense in the second half. Buffalo improved to 5–2 with the win, snapping a two-game losing streak and sweeping the Jets for the first time since 2015 (former head coach Rex Ryan's first season with Buffalo after six seasons with the Jets; the Bills won both meetings that year 22–17, with the latter meeting eliminating the Jets from the playoffs). The Bills also became the first team since 1941 with no touchdowns and also no punts in a game.

Week 8: vs. New England Patriots

In a windy game, both the Bills and Patriots opted for run-heavy offensive attacks, with both teams nearing 200 overall rushing yards apiece, as Bills rookie RB Zack Moss rushed for the first two touchdowns of his career. Played down to the wire, the game was decided when DT Justin Zimmer forced Patriots QB Cam Newton to fumble in the red zone as New England was driving to either tie the game or take the lead on its final drive. With the win, not only did Buffalo improve to 6–2 with a 1.5-game lead over Miami for the division lead, but achieved its first win over the Patriots since 2016 and first at home since 2011. It was also the first career win over the Patriots for both head coach Sean McDermott and QB Josh Allen.

Week 9: vs. Seattle Seahawks

Thanks to an emotionally charged performance from Josh Allen, whose grandmother, Patricia, passed away the previous night, not only did the Bills improve to 7–2 on the season, their strongest record after nine regular season games since 1993, but the team also notched their first victory over the Seahawks since 2008, their first win over a Pete Carroll-coached team since 1999 (when Carroll coached the New England Patriots before being replaced by Bill Belichick the following season) and the most points scored by the Bills in a game since defeating the San Francisco 49ers 45–16 in 2016.

Week 10: at Arizona Cardinals

In a back-and forth game in which the Bills were up 23–9 in the third quarter but then allowed 3 consecutive Cardinals scores, the Bills would go down the field to score with 0:34 remaining on a 21-yard Stefon Diggs touchdown pass from Josh Allen, taking a late 30–26 lead. However, the Cardinals would go down and respond with a score of their own, a 43-yard pass Hail Mary touchdown with Kyler Murray connecting with DeAndre Hopkins with just 0:02 remaining to give the Cardinals the 32–30 win, dropping the Bills to 7–3 heading into the bye week (it would be the team's last loss of the 2020 regular season).

Week 12: vs. Los Angeles Chargers

Despite suffering three turnovers (each in the fourth quarter) and a knee injury Josh Allen sustained in the second quarter, the Bills held on to win, stifling rookie QB Justin Herbert and the Chargers' offense for much of the game. With the win, Buffalo improved to 8–3 and handed Los Angeles its first loss by more than a touchdown of the season. This was also the Bills' first win over the Chargers since 2008 and their first win over the Chargers as a Los Angeles-based team since 1960, in addition to being the first Bills–Chargers matchup since  without QB Philip Rivers on the Chargers' roster (Rivers joined the Indianapolis Colts roster in the offseason).

Week 13: at San Francisco 49ers

This game was played at State Farm Stadium in Glendale, Arizona instead of the 49ers' home stadium, Levi's Stadium in Santa Clara, California, due to COVID-19 cases in Santa Clara County, California. In the Bills' return to the site of the Hail Murray play three weeks earlier, Josh Allen and Cole Beasley led the offense in an effective showing, while the defense kept a stout 49ers rushing offense in check for the most part with linebacker Matt Milano returning from injured reserve. With the win, not only did Buffalo improve to 9–3, but the team also earned its first win on Monday Night Football since . The team also clinched its second winning season in a row, the first time since 1998-1999. The win over their final NFC West opponent also meant that the Hail Murray play cost the Bills a season sweep of the NFC West.

Week 14: vs. Pittsburgh Steelers

The Sunday Night Football matchup was a repeat from Week 15 of the 2019 season, when the Bills traveled to Pittsburgh and won 17–10 to clinch a playoff berth. This time around, Buffalo hosted the Steelers, and once again got their tenth win of the season to start 10–3 for the first time since 1991. After a scoreless first quarter, Pittsburgh scored first with Ben Roethlisberger completing a 19-yard TD pass to James Washington in the second quarter. The Bills then scored on a field goal drive and a 51-yard pick six of Roethlisberger by Taron Johnson to go up 9–7 at halftime, a lead they would never relinquish. The Bills added two third-quarter touchdowns from Allen to Diggs and Gabe Davis respectively to prevail, 26–15. With the win, not only did the Bills match their win total from the previous season and defeat the Steelers at home for the first time since 1999 , but Josh Allen also passed Jim Kelly for most total touchdowns in a single season in team history, while Stefon Diggs tied Eric Moulds' record of 100 receptions in a single season.

Week 15: at Denver Broncos

A 48–19 blowout victory in Denver was the Bills' fourth straight double-digit win, and their first win by more than two scores since Week 12 of 2019 (incidentally also against the Broncos). Their 48 points scored was the greatest number of points scored by the Bills since scoring 49 against the Bengals in Week 11 of 2010. It was also their first road win over the Broncos since 2008. With the dominant win, the Bills not only clinched their third playoff berth in four seasons after having previously missed the playoffs for 17 consecutive seasons, but also won the AFC East division for the first time since 1995. Josh Allen joined Drew Bledsoe in 2002 as the only quarterbacks in franchise history to surpass 4,000 passing yards in a season.

Week 16: at New England Patriots

After a close first quarter, in which the Bills were leading 10–9 following a 9-yard Cam Newton touchdown run, the Bills offense scored 28 unanswered points en route to a 38–9 blowout victory on the final Monday Night Football game of the season, sweeping the Patriots for the first time since  and clinching their first 12-win season since 1993. The win extended the Bills' streak of double-digit wins to five games. Josh Allen passed Jim Kelly's franchise record for most passing touchdowns in a single season with 34, while Stefon Diggs surpassed Eric Moulds for the franchise single-season receiving yards record.

Week 17: vs. Miami Dolphins

In a rematch from Week 2, the Bills closed out the regular season hosting the Dolphins, who needed a win to make the playoffs. The Dolphins were forced to start rookie QB Tua Tagovailoa, as Ryan Fitzpatrick tested positive for COVID-19. Unfortunately for the Dolphins, Tagovailoa had his worst performance of the season, as he had three interceptions (one of which was returned for a TD by Bills CB Josh Norman), despite passing for a career-high 361 yards. QB Josh Allen threw for 224 yards, three TDs and a first quarter interception, with two of those TDs going to WR Isaiah McKenzie, who also returned a punt 84 yards for a TD in the second quarter. Despite Allen being replaced in the second half by Matt Barkley, the Bills continued their dominating performance of the previous five weeks. They extended their streak of double-digit wins to six games by scoring a season-high 56 points, the second-most points in a single game in franchise history (they scored 58 against the Dolphins in 1966).

Despite only playing for one half, Josh Allen still broke the single season record for most passing yards by a QB in franchise history. Meanwhile, Stefon Diggs became the first wide receiver in NFL history to lead the league in both receptions and receiving yards in his first season with a new team. With the 56–26 victory, the Bills finished 13–3 for the franchise's best season since 1991, swept all three divisional opponents for a 6–0 record within the division for the first time in franchise history, and clinched the #2 seed in the playoffs (although they would not get a first-round bye because of the expanded playoff format).

Standings

Division

Conference

Postseason

Schedule

Game summaries

AFC Wild Card Playoffs: vs. (7) Indianapolis Colts

In their fourth consecutive playoff game against the AFC South dating back to 1999, and what would end up being Colts quarterback Philip Rivers' final NFL game, the Bills held on despite a fourth quarter comeback by the Colts to win their first playoff game since 1995. In his first playoff win, Josh Allen threw for 2 touchdowns and 324 passing yards, and scored another rushing touchdown. Dawson Knox and Stefon Diggs caught a touchdown each. Tyler Bass kicked a 54-yard field goal, a new rookie playoff record. Allen became the first QB in NFL history to throw for 300+ yards, run for 50+ yards and complete at least 70% of his passes in a playoff game. The game was also coach Sean McDermott's first playoff win as head coach.

AFC Divisional Playoffs: vs. (5) Baltimore Ravens

After four consecutive playoff games against the AFC South dating back to Music City Miracle in 1999, the Bills finally played a team from another division in the playoffs for the first time since 1998. In a windy game which saw three missed field goals in the first half alone (two by the league's best kicker in Justin Tucker and one by Bills rookie Tyler Bass), the Bills scored the first touchdown of the game in the third quarter on a three-yard pass from Josh Allen to Stefon Diggs to take a 10–3 lead. The Ravens then drove to the Bills' 9 yard line, where quarterback Lamar Jackson threw the first end-zone interception of his career to Bills cornerback Taron Johnson, which was returned 101 yards for a touchdown, tied for the longest pick-six in NFL playoff history, to expand the Bills' lead to 17–3. Jackson then suffered an injury on the next series, and was unable to return. Although the Bills offense was held scoreless for the rest of the game, Ravens backup quarterback Tyler Huntley was unable to complete a comeback, sealing the 17–3 win for the Bills to advance to their first AFC Championship since 1993.

AFC Championship: at (1) Kansas City Chiefs

This was the third AFL/AFC championship game between the two teams. Kansas City won the 1966 AFL Championship game to advance to Super Bowl I, while Buffalo bested the Chiefs in the 1993 AFC Championship game to advance to Super Bowl XXVIII, its fourth in a row. Despite taking a 9–0 lead in the first quarter, the Bills offense was ineffective in the red zone, and on defense, they were unable to contain the Chiefs offense for the remainder of the game. After giving up three consecutive touchdowns in the second quarter, the Bills scored a field goal to go into halftime down 12–21. The Chiefs momentum continued into the second half with two more scoring drives, while the Bills settled for another field goal. In the fourth quarter, Allen's pass intended for receiver John Brown was tipped and intercepted, leading to the Chiefs' final touchdown of the night. The Bills followed up with a scoring drive on a Josh Allen touchdown pass to Isaiah McKenzie, followed by an unsuccessful two-point attempt, and a successful onside kick recovery leading to a field goal. The Chiefs recovered the Bills' next onside kick and were able to drive to the Bills' 15-yard line and run out the clock, ending the Bills' hopes for a comeback victory.

Accolades
Josh Allen: 4x AFC Offensive Player of the Week; 2x AFC Offensive Player of the Month
Stefon Diggs: 1x AFC Offensive Player of the Week
Jerry Hughes: 1x AFC Defensive Player of the Week
A. J. Klein: 1x AFC Defensive Player of the Week
Pro Bowlers:
QB Josh Allen
WR Stefon Diggs
LB Tremaine Edmunds
CB Tre'Davious White
RS Andre Roberts
All-Pro:
WR Stefon Diggs (1st team)
QB Josh Allen (2nd team)
WR Cole Beasley (2nd team)
CB Tre'Davious White (2nd team)
RS Andre Roberts (2nd team)

Notes

References

External links
 

Buffalo
Buffalo Bills seasons
Buffalo Bills
AFC East championship seasons